Slimane Moula (born 25 February 1999) is an Algerian middle-distance runner specialising in the 800 metres.

References

1999 births
Living people
Algerian male middle-distance runners
Athletes (track and field) at the 2022 Mediterranean Games
Mediterranean Games gold medalists for Algeria
African Championships in Athletics winners
Diamond League winners
Mediterranean Games gold medalists in athletics
21st-century Algerian people